Aïn Beïda may refer to several places and jurisdictions in Northern Africa :

 In Algeria
 Aïn Beïda, Oum El Bouaghi, a municipality or commune in Oum El Bouaghi province
 Ain Beida, Ouargla, a municipality or commune in Ouargla Province
 Aïn Beïda, Bouira, a municipality or commune in Bouïra Province
 Aïn Beïda, Aïn Témouchent, a municipality or commune in Aïn Témouchent Province
 Aïn Beïda, Oran, a municipality or commune in Oran Province
 Other
 Ain Beida, Ouezzane, a municipality or commune in Ouezzane Province, Morocco
 Aïn-Beida, Tunisia, near Ancient Tambeae and modern Henchir-Baboucha

See also 
 Aïn Ben Beida, Algeria